Quisi Bryan (born October 2, 1970) is an American man convicted of murdering Cleveland police officer Wayne Leon during a traffic stop in 2000. Bryan is on death row in Ohio and is scheduled to be executed on January 7, 2026.

Crimes
On June 25, 2000, police officer Wayne Leon pulled Bryan over for a traffic violation at a gas station in the Central neighborhood of Cleveland, Ohio. Bryan shot Leon in the face, killing him instantly.

Legal proceedings
Bryan was found guilty of murdering Leon and was sentenced to death.

In 2015, federal public defenders Lori Riga and Alan Rossman represented Bryan on an appeal to the United States District Court for the Northern District of Ohio. Judge James G. Carr overturned Bryan's case because prosecutors improperly tried to remove a prospective black juror from Bryan's trial because of her race. 

The United States Court of Appeals for the Sixth Circuit reversed Carr's decision 2-1 in December 2016, ruling that the Toledo federal judge "improperly substituted its interpretation of the evidence for the findings of the trial judge." The United States Supreme Court declined to hear a challenge to the Sixth Circuit's decision.

Bryan was scheduled to be executed on October 26, 2022, at the Southern Ohio Correctional Facility. On June 24, 2022, Bryan's execution was delayed to January 7, 2026.

Sexual assaults
In 2007, Bryan pled guilty to several sexual assaults that happened prior to his 2000 crime and was sentenced to up to 48 years in prison. In April 2017, he was resentenced to 22 years in prison for the assaults after the Ohio Supreme Court ruled that judges in five Cuyahoga County rape cases wrongly applied sentences to the law at the time the crime occurred.

In 2014, Bryan was convicted of raping and kidnapping a woman on March 15, 1994 by the Cuyahoga County Court of Common Pleas. The jury found Bryan not guilty on a second count of rape against the same woman that stemmed from the same incident. Judge David Matia sentenced Bryan to a maximum of 50 years in prison. Bryan was charged with the crime after the woman's rape kit was tested and Bryan's DNA matched. The victim testified at trial that Bryan led her at knife point behind a vacant home on East 93rd Street in Cleveland into an abandoned car and raped her twice. She stated that Bryan threatened to kill her if she did not cooperate.

See also
 List of death row inmates in the United States
 List of people scheduled to be executed in the United States

References

Living people
1970 births
2000 murders in the United States
American people convicted of murder
American people convicted of rape
American prisoners sentenced to death
20th-century American criminals
21st-century American criminals
American male criminals
People convicted of murder by Ohio
Prisoners sentenced to death by Ohio
2000 in Ohio